Ginting is a surname. Ginting is part of Karo-Bataknesse tribe from the island of Sumatra, Indonesia. Notable people with the surname include:

Anthony Sinisuka Ginting (born 1996), Indonesian badminton player
Lyodra Ginting (born 2003), Indonesian singer

See also
Genting (disambiguation)